Vincenzo Massimo Modica (born 2 March 1971 in Mistretta) is an Italian long-distance runner who competed in the marathon.

He was the bronze medallist in that event at the 1998 European Athletics Championships then took the silver medal behind Abel Antón at the 1999 World Championships in Athletics.

Biography
He was a six-time participant at the IAAF World Cross Country Championships and was twice in the top twenty of the junior race. He represented Italy in the marathon at the 2000 Sydney Olympics, but failed to finish the race.

Achievements

National titles
Vincenzo Modica has won 8 times the individual national championship.
2 wins in 10000 metres (1991, 1999)
3 wins in Half marathon (1992, 1993, 1994)
1 win in Marathon (2005)
2 wins in Cross country running (1993, 1997)

See also
 Italian all-time lists - half marathon

References

External links
 

1971 births
Athletes (track and field) at the 2000 Summer Olympics
Italian male long-distance runners
Italian male cross country runners
Italian male marathon runners
Living people
Olympic athletes of Italy
World Athletics Championships medalists
Athletics competitors of Fiamme Oro
European Athletics Championships medalists
Universiade medalists in athletics (track and field)
World Athletics Championships athletes for Italy
Mediterranean Games bronze medalists for Italy
Mediterranean Games medalists in athletics
Athletes (track and field) at the 1993 Mediterranean Games
Universiade bronze medalists for Italy
Medalists at the 1993 Summer Universiade